Little Squam Lake is a  water body located in Grafton County in the Lakes Region of central New Hampshire, United States, in the towns of Holderness and Ashland.  The lake connects upstream via a short channel to Squam Lake in Holderness.  The two lakes are maintained at a common water level by a dam located one mile downstream from the outlet of Little Squam Lake, on the Squam River, a tributary of the Pemigewasset River.

See also

List of lakes in New Hampshire

External links
 Squam Lakes Association
 Squam and Little Squam Lake fishery and depth map, NH Fish & Game

Lakes of Grafton County, New Hampshire
Lakes of New Hampshire
Holderness, New Hampshire
Ashland, New Hampshire
Squam, Little